Nora Margaret Manella (born January 22, 1951) is the Presiding Justice of the California Second District Court of Appeal, Division Four and a former United States district judge of the United States District Court for the Central District of California.

Education and career

Born in Los Angeles, California, Manella received a Bachelor of Arts degree from Wellesley College in 1972 and a Juris Doctor from the University of Southern California Law School in 1975. She was a law clerk for Judge John Minor Wisdom of the United States Court of Appeals for the Fifth Circuit from 1975 to 1976. She was legal counsel to the Subcommittee on the Constitution, United States Senate Judiciary Committee from 1976 to 1978. She was in private practice in California from 1978 to 1982. She was an Assistant United States Attorney of the Central District of California from 1982 to 1990. She was a judge on the Los Angeles Municipal Court from 1990 to 1992, and on the Los Angeles Superior Court from 1992 to 1994. She was a Justice Pro Tem, California Court of Appeal in 1992. She was the United States Attorney for the Central District of California from 1994 to 1998.

Federal judicial service 

Manella first expressed an interest in serving as a judge on the United States Court of Appeals for the Ninth Circuit in 1995, when she wrote a June 7, 1995 letter to senior presidential advisor George Stephanopoulos expressing her interest in such a seat.

Manella never was nominated to the Ninth Circuit. Instead, on March 31, 1998, President Bill Clinton nominated Manella to be a United States District Judge of the United States District Court for the Central District of California that had been vacated by Mariana Pfaelzer. She was confirmed by the United States Senate on October 21, 1998, and received her judicial commission on October 22, 1998. Manella served in that capacity until May 21, 2006, when she resigned to join the California Court of Appeal, where she has since served in the 2nd District.

Personal

Manella's father, Arthur Manella, was a tax lawyer and a founding partner of Irell & Manella.

References

External links 

|-

1951 births
Living people
Assistant United States Attorneys
Judges of the California Courts of Appeal
Judges of the United States District Court for the Central District of California
People from Los Angeles
Superior court judges in the United States
United States Attorneys for the Central District of California
United States district court judges appointed by Bill Clinton
USC Gould School of Law alumni
20th-century American judges
21st-century American judges
20th-century American women judges
21st-century American women judges